The 2010 Desert 400 was the second event of the 2010 V8 Supercar Championship Series. It was held on the weekend of February 25–27 on Bahrain International Circuit, in Manama, Bahrain. This was first time the event was held since 2008, and for the first time the V8 Supercars used the full Grand Prix Circuit, as used for the Bahrain Grand Prix, rather than the previously Paddock Circuit the Australian sedans used from 2006–2008.

Defending series champion Jamie Whincup made a clean sweep of the V8 Supercar Middle-East branch of the championship. Whincup followed his two wins at the 2010 Yas V8 400 with two more wins to hold a perfect 600 points from the first four races of the season. Mark Winterbottom was best of the rest throughout the weekend with a pair of second positions and Craig Lowndes and Shane van Gisbergen shared the third places.

Results
Results as follows:

Qualifying Race 3
Qualifying timesheets:

Race 3
Race timesheets:

Qualifying Race 4
Qualifying timesheets:

Race 4
Race timesheets:

Standings
After race 4 of 26

Source

See also 
 2010 Bahrain International Circuit GP2 Asia Series round (February)

References

External links
Desert 400 website
Official timing and results

Desert
Desert 400